The Lawrence Batley International was a European Tour golf tournament which was played annually from 1981 to 1987. The first three editions were played at Bingley St Ives, Bradford, the next three at Ryder Cup venue The Belfry and the final edition at Open Championship venue Royal Birkdale. The six different winners included four major championship winners: Nick Faldo, Sandy Lyle, Mark O'Meara and Ian Woosnam. In 1987 the prize fund was £150,000, which was the fourth smallest on the European Tour that year.

Winners

External links
Coverage on the European Tour's official site

Former European Tour events
Golf tournaments in England